Mount Muria or Gunung Muria is a dormant volcano on the north coast of Java, Indonesia.  It is located in the center of the Muria peninsula, which juts northward into the Java Sea on the north coast of Central Java, Indonesia east of Semarang, the capital of the province. Mount Muria is 1602 meters high but once was maybe twice that height. Mount Muria was once an island, separated from Java by the Muria Strait. This strait closed around 1657.

The Muria area is notable for a number of reasons. It contains the grave sites of two of the Wali Sanga of Java - Sunan Muria, also known as Raden Umar Said, whose grave is in Colo on the southern slopes of Mount Muria, and Sunan Kudus, known also as Ja'far Shadiq, whose grave is in the city of Kudus to the south of Mount Muria.  The Wali Sanga are the nine Islamic Saints associated with the origins of Islam in Java. As a consequence the grave is part of the network of sites in Java considered to be sacred. The name Kudus means "holy."

The area is also the locale of the missionary origins of the Muria Javanese Church, Gereja Injili di Tanah Jawa, in whose history the legendary Javanese Christian mystic Kiai Ibrahim Tunggul Wulung played an important role.  It is also the area of the missionary origins of the Gereja Kristen Muria Indonesia Mennonite Christian group.  

Major products of this area of Java are rice, sugar, coffee, fish, rubber, coconuts and clove cigarettes.

Abandoned nuclear project
From 1976 to 2015 there was a plan to build a nuclear power plant on Mount Muria. Construction was scheduled to begin in 1997 but halted due to the 1997 Asian financial crisis. In 2007, construction was scheduled to begin again but was halted by a sudden outbreak of anti-nuclear protests. After the protests continued for several months, the local branch of Nahdlatul Ulama denounced the project to build on the sacred mountain. They declared that the government's plan was haram because it would force Indonesia to import foreign uranium, hire foreign experts to manage the plant, and pay the costs to dismantle the plant and store the nuclear waste indefinitely. The national chairman of NU refused to support the local decision, but said that NU would not overrule a finding by a local branch about matters exclusively pertaining to the local branch.

Following the Fukushima Daiichi nuclear disaster, the Indonesian government suspended the project. In 2015 the project was permanently halted after nearly 40 years of planning. Indonesia no longer has active nuclear projects.

See also
List of volcanoes in Indonesia
Religion in Indonesia

References

External links

Links relating to Sunan Muria (Raden Umar Said)
https://web.archive.org/web/20061008224939/http://www.petra.ac.id/eastjava/walisongo/muria.htm

Volcanoes of Central Java
Stratovolcanoes of Indonesia
Pleistocene stratovolcanoes
Holocene stratovolcanoes